Conocephalus aigialus, the seashore meadow katydid, is a species of meadow katydid in the family Tettigoniidae. It is found in North America.

References

aigialus
Articles created by Qbugbot
Insects described in 1915